1-Bromobutane is the organobromine compound with the formula CH3(CH2)3Br. It is a colorless liquid, although impure samples appear yellowish.  It is insoluble in water, but soluble in organic solvents. It is primarily used as a source of the butyl group in organic synthesis.  It is one of several isomers of butyl bromide.

Synthesis
Most 1-bromoalkanes are prepared by free-radical addition of hydrogen bromide to the 1-alkene.  These conditions lead to the anti-Markovnikov addition, i.e. give the 1-bromo derivatives.

1-Bromobutane can also be prepared from butanol by treatment with hydrobromic acid:
CH3(CH2)3OH  +  HBr   →   CH3(CH2)3Br  +  H2O

Reactions
As a primary haloalkane, it is prone to SN2 type reactions. It is commonly used as an alkylating agent.  When combined with magnesium metal in dry ether, it gives the corresponding Grignard reagent. Such reagents are used to attach butyl groups to various substrates.

1-Bromobutane is the precursor to n-butyllithium:
 2 Li + C4H9X  →  C4H9Li  +  LiX
 where X = Cl, Br
The lithium for this reaction contains 1-3% sodium.  When bromobutane is the precursor, the product is a homogeneous solution, consisting of a mixed cluster containing both LiBr and LiBu.

References

Bromoalkanes
Alkylating agents